Sin (Swedish: Synd, German: 	Rausch) is a 1928 silent drama film directed by Gustaf Molander and starring Lars Hanson, Elissa Landi and Gina Manès. It was a co-production between Germany, Sweden and the United Kingdom. It premiered in Sweden in September 1928 but was not released in London until January 1929.

It was shot at the Råsunda Studios in Stockholm and on location in the city. The film's sets were designed by the art director Vilhelm Bryde, who also produced the film. It is based on an 1899 play by August Strindberg which had previously been made into a 1919 film Intoxication directed by Ernst Lubitsch.

Synopsis
Maurice is a struggling playwright in Paris, whose lack of success means he and his daughter Marion have to be supported by his wife Jeanne, putting severe strains on the marriage. When Maurice does enjoy a success at last he is lured by the femme fatale actress Henriette who desires a sexual relationship with him. He is brought back to his senses, however, when his daughter Marion disappears.

Cast
 Lars Hanson as 	Maurice Gérard, the Writer
 Elissa Landi as 	Jeanne, Gérard's Wife
 Anita Hugo as Marion, Jeanne's 5-y-o Daughter
 Gina Manès as Henriette Mauclerc, the Actress
 Hugo Björne as 	Adolphe, the Painter
 Stina Berg as 	Madame Cathérine, the Café Owner
 Carl Apolloff as 	Theater director's valet
 Ragnar Arvedson as 	Guest
 Georgina Barcklind as 	Henriettes påkläderska	
 Erik 'Bullen' Berglund as 	Maitre d' at the Royal
 Jenny Broberg as 	Portvaktsfrun
 Ossian Brofeldt as 	Neighbor
 Carl Browallius as 	Judge
 Gucken Cederborg as 	Theater spectator
 John Ekman as Theatre Director
 Nils Ekstam as 	Café guest
 Eric Gustafson as 	Theatre Spectator
 Gösta Gustafson as Guest
 Justus Hagman as 	Old theatre guard
 Ivan Hedqvist as 	Jeanne's Father
 Thure Holm as 	Older theatre spectator with mustache
 Nils Jacobsson as 	Guest
 Ludde Juberg as Theater spectator
 Kolbjörn Knudsen as 	Guest
 Knut Lambert as 	Man in theater
 Herman Lantz as Statist in theater scene
 John Melin as 	Guest
 Gustaf Salzenstein as 	Neighbor girl's father
 Ida Schylander as 	Older theater spectator
 Fredrik Stenfeldt as 	Old man
 Emile Stiebel as 	Theatre Director
 Albert Ståhl as 	Courtmaster
 Birgit Tengroth as Girl Nextdoor
 Wilhelm Tunelli as 	Café guest
 Ruth Weijden as Theatre Spectator
 Kurt Welin as 	Theatre Spectator

References

Bibliography
 Gustafsson, Tommy. Masculinity in the Golden Age of Swedish Cinema: A Cultural Analysis of 1920s Films. McFarland, 2014.

External links

1928 films
Swedish silent feature films
British silent feature films
German silent feature films
1928 drama films
Swedish drama films
British drama films
German drama films
Films of the Weimar Republic
Films directed by Gustaf Molander
Swedish black-and-white films
Bavaria Film films
Films set in Paris
Films based on works by August Strindberg
British films based on plays
German films based on plays
Swedish films based on plays
1920s British films
Silent drama films
1920s Swedish films
1920s German films